Open Fire is single British television crime drama film, made for ITV, which first broadcast on 12 November 1994. The film was written and directed by Paul Greengrass, and concerns the police manhunt for David Martin, who escaped from custody following his arrest for shooting a police officer, leading up to the shooting in error of another man, Stephen Waldorf. The film starred Rupert Graves as Martin, as well as Samuel West as Waldorf, Douglas Hodge as investigating officer DC Peter Finch, and Kate Hardie as Sue Stephens. Open Fire was filmed in Belsize Park and in around Hampstead, London. The film has never been released commercially.

Plot
The film concerns the manhunt for David Martin, and the events surrounding this in which Stephen Waldorf, a 26-year-old film editor, was mistakenly identified as Martin and shot by police firearms officers. The story focuses on Finch, a young police officer who, at the beginning of the film, is awarded a medal for bravery in the course of duty after he arrested an armed criminal, and David Martin. Martin — a transvestite with a provocative and aggressive temperament — is released from prison having served his latest sentence. He has escaped twice during his time in custody, and is soon in trouble once again. During the course of a burglary at a private cinema, Martin shoots a police officer as he tries to escape. After he is later arrested, he promptly escapes and goes on the run. By 1983 he is Britain's most wanted man, and a massive police manhunt is under way to apprehend him.

As the hunt for Martin intensifies, police identify a suspect whom they believe might be the fugitive, but after he is shot by Finch, he turns out not to be Martin. The car driver fled the scene. Finch is subsequently suspended from duty. The case becomes a police scandal, with Finch accused of attempted murder. Martin is finally caught after being chased into an Underground station and along a railway tunnel, where police eventually corner and arrest him, without any shot fired.

Cast
 Rupert Graves as David Martin
 Samuel West as Steven Waldorf
 Douglas Hodge as DC Peter Finch
 Kate Hardie as Sue Stephens
 Eddie Izzard as Rich
 Jim Carter as Det Chief Supt. Young
 Colin McCormack as Det. Chief Supt. Haylor
 Sam Halpenny as DC Peter Van Dee
 Joe Tucker as DS Paul Johnson
 Aran Bell as PC Nicholas Carr
 Gwyneth Powell as Gloria Martin
 Trevor Byfield as Ralph Martin
 Susan Tordoff as Susan Finch

References

External links
 

1994 television films
1994 films
1994 crime drama films
Biographical films about criminals
British crime drama films
Crime films based on actual events
Crime television films
Films directed by Paul Greengrass
Films set in London
Films set in 1983
London Weekend Television shows
ITV television dramas
Television series by ITV Studios
1990s British films
British drama television films